The 28th Assembly District of Wisconsin is one of 99 districts in the Wisconsin State Assembly. Located in far northwestern Wisconsin, the district comprises most of Polk County and neighboring towns in northern St. Croix County and southern Burnett County.  It includes the cities of Amery and St. Croix Falls, as well as the villages of Balsam Lake, Centuria, Clayton, Dresser, Frederic, Grantsburg, Luck, Osceola, Siren, Somerset, and Webster.  It contains the Wisconsin portion of Interstate Park.  The district is represented by Republican Gae Magnafici, since January 2019.

The 28th Assembly district is located within Wisconsin's 10th Senate district, along with the 29th and 30th Assembly districts.

List of past representatives

References 

Wisconsin State Assembly districts
Burnett County, Wisconsin
Polk County, Wisconsin
St. Croix County, Wisconsin